Study Breaks is a monthly lifestyle magazine aimed at college aged students. As a student entertainment magazine on many campuses around Texas, it has a circulation of over 50,000.  Study Breaks was started in Austin in 1988 and is run by Collegiate Entrepreneurs Organization (CEO), a professional registered student organization. CEO has various national chapters. The publisher is Shweiki Media Printing Company.

Markets
University of Texas at Austin
Texas State University
Texas Tech University
University of Texas at San Antonio

References

External links
 
 

1988 establishments in Texas
Entertainment magazines published in the United States
Lifestyle magazines published in the United States
Magazines established in 1988
Magazines published in Austin, Texas
Monthly magazines published in the United States
Student magazines published in the United States